Buckeye Local High School is a public high school in Connorville, Ohio, United States, near Rayland. It is the only secondary school in the Buckeye Local School District.  Athletic teams compete as the Buckeye Local Panthers in the Ohio High School Athletic Association as a member of the Ohio Valley Athletic Conference. 

Since 2010, the Buckeye Local Junior High School, grades 7-8, occupy the lower floor of the high school building. Grades 9-12, occupying the upper floor, are administered separately.

History
Buckeye Local High School was established by the Buckeye Local School District by the consolidation of the three existing high schools in the district: Buckeye North, Buckeye South, and Buckeye West, all in southern Jefferson County. The new high school opened in the fall of 1990.

Athletics

OHSAA State Championships

 Boys Baseball* – 1932, 1942 
 Boys Basketball** - 1943 
 *Titles won by Tiltonsville High School prior to consolidation.
 **Title won by Yorkville High School prior to consolidation.

OVAC Conference Championships
Baseball - 2004
Girls Basketball - 1992
Boys Cross Country - 1998, 2003, 2004, 2005
Girls Cross Country - 1997, 1998, 2007
Football - 1991, 1994, 2003, 2009
Softball - 1999, 2012, 2013
Girls Track - 2007
Wrestling - 1996, 1997, 2004

Notable alumni
 Stan Boroski** - former MLB player for the Milwaukee Brewers and Kansas City Royals, current bullpen coach for the Tampa Bay Rays
 Dino Gaudio** - former men's college basketball coach
 Bill Mazeroski* - former MLB player for the Pittsburgh Pirates, Baseball Hall of Fame inductee
 *Attended Warren Consolidated High School prior to consolidation into Buckeye Local High School.
 **Attended Buckeye South High School prior to consolidation into Buckeye Local High School.

References

External links
 District Website

High schools in Jefferson County, Ohio
Public high schools in Ohio